Love Held Lightly: Rare Songs by Harold Arlen is an album by Peggy Lee that was released in 1993.

Track listing
1. "Look Who's Been Dreaming" (Dorothy Fields) 2:40
2. "Love Held Lightly (from Saratoga)" (Johnny Mercer) 4:18
3. "Buds Won't Bud" (Yip Harburg) 3:30
4. "Can You Explain?" (Truman Capote) 3:39
5. "Wait'll It Happens to You" (Mercer) 2:31
6. "Come on, Midnight" (Martin Charnin) 4:38
7. "Happy with the Blues" (Peggy Lee) 4:25
8. "Bad for Each Other" (Carolyn Leigh) 3:27
9. "Love's No Stranger to Me" (Capote) 2:49
10. "I Could Be Good for You" (Charnin) 2:39
11. "Got to Wear You Off My Weary Mind" (Mercer) 4:13
12. "I Had a Love Once" (Harold Arlen) 2:44
13. "Love's a Necessary Thing" (Ted Koehler) 3:38
14. "My Shining Hour" (Mercer) 2:35

All songs composed by Harold Arlen, lyricists indicated.

References

1993 albums
1988 albums
Peggy Lee albums
Capitol Records albums
Harold Arlen tribute albums